The Kurdzhips, located in the Caucasus Mountains, is a river in the Apsheronsky District of Krasnodar region, Russia. It is a left tributary of the Belaya near Maykop.

The river is a venue for wilderness and extreme sports. The river gained world attention in 2000 when Neanderthal remains were discovered in a cave on its banks.

References

Rivers of Krasnodar Krai